is a district of Setagaya, Tokyo, Japan.

Education
Setagaya Board of Education operates public elementary and junior high schools.

1-2 chome and part of 3-chome are zoned to Karasuyama Elementary School (烏山小学校). 4-5 chome and the rest of 3-chome are zoned to Kyuden Elementary School (給田小学校). All of Kyuden is zoned to Kamisoshigaya Junior High School (上祖師谷中学校).

References

Districts of Setagaya